The 1928 Sheffield Hallam by-election was held on 16 July 1928. The by-election was held due to the appointment of the incumbent Conservative MP, Frederick Sykes, as Governor of Bombay. It was won by the Conservative candidate Louis Smith. At the previous two general elections (1923 and 1924) the Conservative candidate had won the seat with majorities of over 6,000 votes.

Result

After winning the by-election, Smith successfully defended the seat  at the following year's general election. On that occasion he won with an increased majority of 6,787 votes in a straight fight with a Labour candidate. At the same contest, Hobman fought Bradford North for the Liberals, but again finished in third place.

References

1928 in England
1928 elections in the United Kingdom
By-elections to the Parliament of the United Kingdom in Sheffield constituencies
1920s in Yorkshire